Jaycee Carlos Marcelino (born October 19, 1995) is a Filipino basketball player for the Zamboanga Family's Brand Sardines of the Maharlika Pilipinas Basketball League (MPBL). He was drafted 17th overall pick in the 2nd round of the 2019 PBA draft.

Professional basketball career
Marcelino was drafted by the Alaska Aces in the 2nd round (5th) of the 2019 PBA draft.

In 2022, he and his twin brother, Jayvee debuted at the Maharlika Pilipinas Basketball League with Zamboanga Family's Brand Sardines.

PBA career statistics

As of the end of 2021 season

Season-by-season averages

|-
| align="left" | 
| align="left" rowspan="2" | Alaska
| 5 || 4.3 || .571 || - || 1.000 || .4 || .4 || .2 || - || 1.8
|-
| align="left" | 
| 10 || 8.2 || .467 || .000 || 1.000 || 1.2 || .8  || .5 || .1 || 3.0
|-class=sortbottom
| align="center" colspan=2 | Career
| 15 || 6.9 || .486 || .000 || 1.000 || .9 || .7 || .4 || .1 || 2.6

References 

1997 births
Living people
Alaska Aces (PBA) players
Basketball players from Zambales
Filipino men's basketball players
Lyceum Pirates basketball players
Point guards
Sportspeople from Olongapo
Alaska Aces (PBA) draft picks
Maharlika Pilipinas Basketball League players
Filipino twins
Twin sportspeople

Zamboanga Valientes players